Eduardo Zorita (born 1961 in Madrid) is a Spanish paleoclimatologist. , he is a Senior Scientist at the Institute for Coastal Research, GKSS Research Centre in Geesthacht, Germany, where he has worked since 1996. Zorita is review editor of the journal Climate Research.

Professional life 

Zorita received his Ph.D in solid state physics at the University of Zaragoza in 1988, and then held a postdoctoral appointment at the Max Planck Institute for Meteorology, Hamburg. He was an Associate Researcher at the Laboratoire de Océanographie Dynamique et de Climatologie (LOCEAN), Pierre-and-Marie-Curie University, Paris, 1994–95.

Zorita is a regular contributor to Die Klimazwiebel, a climate science blog operated by Hans von Storch, Zorita and other climate scientists.

In 2013 he was part of a research group confirming the hockey stick graph reconstruction.

Climatic Research Unit email controversy
At the outset of the Climatic Research Unit email controversy (Climategate) Zorita published his opinion on his personal wab site. This was republished by The Wall Street Journal on 5 December 2009:

Zorita set up the Klimazwiebel blog shortly afterwards, on 9 December 2009. In a 2012 interview with Hans von Storch, Zorita said "Climategate did not show that the essentials of climate science were wrong or that anthropogenic climate change is the result of a conspiracy. It did show that some scientists were impelled to present a clean story, cleaner than it really is, and in doing so they went a bit too far." He felt that in trying to present a clear message, scientists had lost public credibility, but independent groups checking work which appeared compromised found that the original conclusions were in order. In particular, the main surface temperature datasets which had been called into question were confirmed by the Muller et al. data analysis.

Selected publications

References

Sources and external links
Eduardo Zorita's home page at the Institute for Coastal Research
Die Klimazwiebel blog
Zorita's Photostream at Flickr

Intergovernmental Panel on Climate Change contributing authors
Living people
Spanish scientists
Paleoclimatologists
1961 births